This article is about the demographic features of the population of New Caledonia, including population density, ethnicity, education level, health of the populace, economic status, religious affiliations and other aspects of the population.

Historical population

Vital statistics

Births and deaths 

ISEE - Démographie

Ethnic groups 

Ethnic Melanesians known as Kanak constituted 41.2% of the population in 2019, followed by Europeans with 24.1%. The Europeans are the largest ethnic group in the South Province, where they make up a plurality, while Kanak are the majority in the two other provinces. The remainder of the population are Wallis and Futunan (8.3%), Tahitian (2.0%), Indonesians (1.4%), Ni-Vanuatu (0.9%), Vietnamese, other Asian (0.4%), Mixed (11.3%), and belong to other ethnic groups (9.5%).
An estimate of 15,000 Caledonians were of Algerian descent.

CIA World Factbook demographic statistics
The following demographic statistics are from the CIA World Factbook.

Age structure
0–14 years: 21.74% (male 32,227/female 30,819)
15–24 years: 15.63% (male 23,164/female 22,163)
25–54 years: 43.73% (male 63,968/female 62,856)
55–64 years: 9.06% (male 12,700/female 13,568)
65 years and over: 9.84% (male 12,552/female 15,992)

Population 
297,160

Population growth rate
1.19%

Birth rate
14.13 births/1,000 population

Death rate
5.88 deaths/1,000 population

Net migration rate
3.66 migrant(s)/1,000 population

Sex ratio
At birth: 1.05 male(s)/female
0–14 years: 1.04 male(s)/female
15–24 years: 1.04 male(s)/female
25–54 years: 1.02 male(s)/female
55–64 years: 0.94 male(s)/female
65 years and over: 0.59 male(s)/female
Total population: 0.99 male(s)/female (2022 est.)

Infant mortality rate
Total: 5 deaths/1,000 live births
Male: 5.97 deaths/1,000 live births
Female: 3.98 deaths/1,000 live births

Life expectancy at birth
Total population: 78.83 years
Male: 74.93 years
Female: 82.92 years

Total fertility rate
1.86 children born/woman

Nationality
noun: New Caledonian(s)
adjective: New Caledonian

Religions
Roman Catholic 60%
Protestant 30%
Other 10%

Ethnic groups
Kanak 39.1%
European 27.1%
Wallisian and Futunian 8.2%
Tahitian 2.1%
Indonesian 1.4%
Ni-Vanuatu 1%
Vietnamese 0.9%
Other 17.7%
Unspecified 2.5%

Languages
French (official)
33 Melanesian-Polynesian dialects

Literacy
Definition: age 15 and over can read and write
Total population: 96.9%
Male: 97.3%
Female: 96.5%

See also
New Caledonia
Europeans in Oceania

References

 
Geography of New Caledonia
Demographics of France